Shireen Olive Ritchie, Baroness Ritchie of Brompton ( Folkard; 22 June 1945 – 24 April 2012) was a Conservative Councillor for the Brompton Ward, Royal Borough of Kensington and Chelsea and advocate for women in the Conservative Party of the United Kingdom. She was a Conservative working peer in the House of Lords and President of the National Children's Bureau.

Politics
Shireen Ritchie was a Kensington and Chelsea Councillor from 1998 representing the Brompton ward on the council. In 2008, she provided testimony as part of the Home Affairs Committee hearings on Trade in Human Beings. She was involved in efforts of the Conservative Party to raise awareness among constituents about the importance of the issue of diversity to the party, including the party's Women2Win efforts in 2005, and Priority List (A-List) candidates, for which she received scorn from other Conservative party members. She held a seat as the Chair of the party's Candidates Committee and was named as a 'Champion' for the Conservative Women's Organisation.

While she was chair of LGA's Family and Children's Services in 2010, the department underwent an effort to reduce paperwork to "ease the pressure on social workers and increase the quality of care offered to children." She was a member of the Family Justice Review Panel.

On 25 June 2010, she was created a life peer as Baroness Ritchie of Brompton, of Brompton, in the Royal Borough of Kensington and Chelsea, and she was introduced in the House of Lords on 29 June 2010.

Family
Born Shireen Olive Folkard, she spent her early life in Yemen where her father was a British diplomat. After attending St Mary's Gate School, Southbourne, Dorset, she worked as a fashion model until her marriage.

She had a son by her first marriage to John Williams. Her second marriage was to the advertising executive John Vivian Ritchie, becoming stepmother to his children Tabitha Ritchie and Guy Ritchie.

References

Further reading

Obituary, telegraph.co.uk. Accessed 3 January 2023.

1945 births
2012 deaths
Conservative Party (UK) councillors
Conservative Party (UK) life peers
Life peeresses created by Elizabeth II
Councillors in the Royal Borough of Kensington and Chelsea
Place of birth missing
Women councillors in England